Pedro Bay Airport  is a state-owned public-use airport located one nautical mile (1.85 km) west of the central business district of Pedro Bay, in the Lake and Peninsula Borough of the U.S. state of Alaska.

As per Federal Aviation Administration records, the airport had 678 passenger boardings (enplanements) in calendar year 2008, a decrease of 47% from the 1,271 enplanements in 2007. This airport is included in the FAA's National Plan of Integrated Airport Systems for 2009–2013, which categorized it as a general aviation facility.

Facilities and aircraft 
It has one runway designated 9/27 with a gravel surface measuring 3,000 by 60 feet (914 x 18 m). For the 12-month period ending December 31, 2008, the airport had 1,050 aircraft operations, an average of 87 per month: 52% general aviation and 48% air taxi.

Airlines and destinations

References

External links 
 FAA Alaska airport diagram (GIF)

Airports in Lake and Peninsula Borough, Alaska